Juan Carlos Natale López (born 26 January 1981) is a Mexican politician. From 2009 to 2012 he served as Deputy of the LXI Legislature of the Mexican Congress representing Puebla.

References

1981 births
Living people
Politicians from Veracruz
Ecologist Green Party of Mexico politicians
21st-century Mexican politicians
Deputies of the LXI Legislature of Mexico
Members of the Chamber of Deputies (Mexico) for Puebla